The Enfield Center Town House is an historic former town hall on New Hampshire Route 4A in Enfield Center, New Hampshire. Constructed in 1845–46, it was added to the National Register of Historic Places (NRHP) in 2017.

The building was moved and expanded in 1859, and was renovated in 1909; it was last used as a town hall in 1913. It is diagonally across the street from the Centre Village Meeting House, which is also NRHP-listed.

See also
National Register of Historic Places listings in Grafton County, New Hampshire

References

Further reading

City and town halls on the National Register of Historic Places in New Hampshire
Government buildings completed in 1845
Buildings and structures in Grafton County, New Hampshire
National Register of Historic Places in Grafton County, New Hampshire
Enfield, New Hampshire